Five Forks, West Virginia may refer to:

Five Forks, Calhoun County, West Virginia, an unincorporated community
Five Forks, Ritchie County, West Virginia, an unincorporated community
Five Forks, Upshur County, West Virginia, an unincorporated community